Colton White (born May 3, 1997) is a Canadian professional ice hockey defenceman for the  Anaheim Ducks of the National Hockey League (NHL). He was selected by the New Jersey Devils, 97th overall, in the 2015 NHL Entry Draft.

Playing career
White played minor midget hockey with the London Jr. Knights before he was selected in the 2013 Ontario Hockey League Priority Selection, 22nd overall, by the Sault Ste. Marie Greyhounds. He joined the Greyhounds as a rookie for the 2013–14 season.

White was drafted by the New Jersey Devils in the fourth round, 97th overall, in the 2015 NHL Draft. On September 22, 2016, White was signed by the Devils to a three-year, entry-level contract.

During the 2018–19 season, having played 61 games with AHL affiliate, the Binghamton Devils, White received his first NHL recall by New Jersey on March 13, 2019. He made his NHL debut that day, helping the Devils blueline in a 6–3 victory over the Edmonton Oilers at Rogers Arena in Edmonton, Alberta.

Following his fifth season within the Devils organization, White left as a free agent and was signed to a two-year, two-way contract with the Anaheim Ducks on July 14, 2022.

Career statistics

References

External links
 

1997 births
Living people
Adirondack Thunder players
Anaheim Ducks players
Binghamton Devils players
Canadian ice hockey defencemen
New Jersey Devils draft picks
New Jersey Devils players
San Diego Gulls (AHL) players
Sault Ste. Marie Greyhounds players
Utica Comets players